Malik Ali Abbas Khokhar is a Pakistani politician who was a Member of the Provincial Assembly of the Punjab, from 2008 to May 2018 and from August 2018 to January 2023.

Early life and education
He was born on 5 January 1972 in Okara.

He graduated from University of the Punjab in 1994.

Political career

He was elected to the Provincial Assembly of the Punjab as an independent candidate from Constituency PP-192 (Okara-VIII) in 2008 Pakistani general election. He received 19,094 votes and defeated an independent candidate, Mian Sana Ullah Daula.

He was re-elected to the Provincial Assembly of the Punjab as a candidate of Pakistan Muslim League (N) (PML-N) from Constituency PP-192 (Okara-VIII) in 2013 Pakistani general election. He received 42,073 votes and defeated Chaudhry Tariq Irshad Khan, a candidate of Pakistan Tehreek-e-Insaf (PTI).

He was re-elected to Provincial Assembly of the Punjab as a candidate of PML-N from Constituency PP-187 (Okara-V) in 2018 Pakistani general election.

References

Living people
Punjab MPAs 2013–2018
1972 births
Pakistan Muslim League (N) MPAs (Punjab)
Punjab MPAs 2008–2013
Punjab MPAs 2018–2023